Pronoterus is a genus of beetles in the family Noteridae, containing the following species:

 Pronoterus obscuripennis Fleutiaux & Sallé, 1890
 Pronoterus punctipennis Sharp, 1882
 Pronoterus semipunctatus (LeConte, 1878)

References

Noteridae